X-Force is a fictional team of superheroes appearing in American comic books published by Marvel Comics, most commonly in association with the X-Men. Conceived by writer/illustrator Rob Liefeld, the team first appeared in New Mutants #100 (April 1991) and soon afterwards was featured in its own series called X-Force. The group was originally a revamped version of the 1980s team, the New Mutants.

X-Force's first leader was the mutant Cable. An offshoot of the X-Men, X-Force takes a more militant and aggressive approach towards its enemies compared to the X-Men.

An alternate incarnation of X-Force appears in the 2018 film Deadpool 2 as part of the X-Men film series. A planned X-Force film adaption by 20th Century Fox was in production, but it was cancelled after Disney acquired 20th Century Fox.

Publication history

Publication

The X-Force series was successful in the early 1990s, but its popularity waned after Liefeld left, which caused Marvel to implement several reforms to the title from 1995 until 2001 with varying degrees of success. Low sales on the X-Force series eventually prompted Marvel to revamp the title in 2001 with a new cast in the form of a group of self-interested young mutants who were gathered together by a corporation to become media stars and used the name X-Force. X-Force was canceled with #129 and relaunched as X-Statix, which coincided with a similar rebranding of the team in the story. After X-Statix was canceled with #26, Marvel reunited the original X-Force team for a six-issue 2004 limited series plotted and drawn by Liefeld.

In 2007–2008, during the Messiah Complex crossover, a new version of the X-Force team was formed with Wolverine leading a more militaristic black ops branch of the X-Men. This squad would form the basis for a new X-Force series starting February 2008 by writers Craig Kyle and Christopher Yost, plus Clayton Crain as the artist. The series came to a conclusion in September 2010 as part of the Second Coming storyline that ran through various X-titles. The title was then relaunched in October 2010 as Uncanny X-Force with Rick Remender and Jerome Opeña as the creative team and Wolverine, Psylocke, Deadpool, Archangel, Fantomex, and E.V.A. as the initial roster.

The Uncanny X-Force series ended at issue #35 in 2012 and was once again relaunched as Uncanny X-Force vol. 2 as part of Marvel NOW!, with a new team led by Storm and Psylocke, written by Sam Humphries. A concurrent X-Force book written by Dennis Hopeless, Cable and X-Force, was released at the same time, bringing Cable back into the X-Force fold. The two series ended in 2014 after a crossover between the two titled "Vendetta". A new X-Force (vol. 4), was launched featuring a black ops squad composed of Cable, Psylocke, Fantomex and Marrow, written by X-Men: Legacy writer Simon Spurrier.

Uncanny X-Force

X-Force was replaced in October 2010 with Uncanny X-Force by Rick Remender and Jerome Opeña. This new series introduces team members Psylocke, Fantomex, and Deadpool. According to Remender, "This is a group of characters that have had their souls stained by evil forces in the past, a common thread connecting them. They've already made the hard compromises in the past; they've all taken life."

The title had a three-issue "Fear Itself" tie-in miniseries, written by Rob Williams, with art by Simone Bianchi. As of issue #34, thirty-one characters were killed and 14 of them were from the "Age of Apocalypse" timeline.

Uncanny X-Force Volume 2: 2013–2014

As part of Marvel NOW!, two new X-Force series would replace Remender's Uncanny X-Force. Prior to their announcement, the two titles were teased by a single word and the book's creative team: "Wanted" with Dennis Hopeless and Salvador Larroca and "Killers" with Sam Humphries and Ron Garney. "Wanted" was first revealed to be the brand new "Cable and X-Force" with "Killers" later revealed to be a relaunched "Uncanny X-Force."

Cable and X-Force, written by Dennis Hopeless and penciled by Salvador Larroca, featured Cable on the run after awakening from a coma in the post-AvX world. Harkening back to the early days of the original X-Force, Cable would lead an outlaw X-Force team consisting of Domino, Colossus, Forge, Doctor Nemesis and Boom-Boom, whose missions of stopping huge tragedies before they happen puts them at odds with the newly formed Uncanny Avengers, led by Cable's uncle, Havok.

The relaunched Uncanny X-Force was written by Sam Humphries and penciled by Ron Garney, and featured a Psylocke-led team with an initial roster of Storm, Puck, and Cluster. They would be joined by Spiral and Bishop as they sought to locate a psychic mutant girl who had been kidnapped.

Plot summary

Volume 3

Angels and Demons

The team's first mission has them investigating the theft of Bastion's head from a S.H.I.E.L.D. base. The trail leads back to the Purifiers, led by Matthew Risman and the mysterious Eli Bard. They attach Bastion's head to the body of a Nimrod unit, to use the revived Bastion in their "holy war" against mutantkind. Bastion retrieves an offspring of the technarch Magus from the ocean floor and revives several deceased X-Men villains, including Cameron Hodge, Bolivar Trask and Graydon Creed, by infecting their corpses with the Technarch Transmode Virus. The virus allows Bastion a degree of mental control over the revived corpses. He also infects two living subjects with the virus: Donald Pierce and the Leper Queen.

During X-Force's raid on a Purifer base, Risman holds Wolfsbane hostage. While Wolverine calls for the team to stand down, X-23 decides Risman is bluffing and activates a concealed detonator that sets off a series of powerful explosives. The explosion brings most of the base down around them, but Risman is able to escape with Wolfsbane during the chaos. Wolverine later admonishes Laura for being so reckless with the lives of her teammates and for allowing Rahne to be kidnapped. After interrogating and killing numerous Purifiers, X-Force finds Rahne held in a warehouse, barely alive. Angel retrieves Elixir to heal Rahne, who wakes up soon after. Laura then catches the scent of Elixir's and Angel's blood, and runs off to help them. She reaches the room just in time to see Wolfsbane standing above Angel with his severed wings in her jaws. While in the Purifiers' custody, Rahne had been brainwashed by her deranged father, Reverend Craig, causing her to go berserk at the sight of an angelic figure. Wolfsbane savagely attacks Laura before handing over Angel's wings to the Purifiers.

Elixir heals both his and Angel's wounds, then discovers that Angel's wings aren't organic and can't be regrown. Angel transforms into Archangel, complete with metallic wings. Archangel wounds Wolverine and X-23 before taking off toward the Purifiers' base, sensing his old wings. Meanwhile, the Purifiers use samples of Angel's stolen wings to develop techno-organic wings for their soldiers, giving them similar abilities to Archangel. The group of Purifiers given wings is dubbed "The Choir". X-Force pursues Archangel to the Purifiers' base and slaughters most of The Choir, while Risman discovers Eli Bard absorbing the Technarch offspring into his hand. X-23 kills Risman with a headshot, and briefly fights Eli. Eli overpowers her, but is prevented from killing her when Warpath stabs him, causing him to flee. Wolverine takes on Bastion, who deems the threat posed by Wolverine "unacceptable" and retreats. Afterwards, X-Force finds Archangel unconscious and in human form, complete with feathered wings. Wolverine informs Cyclops of the turn of events, and Cyclops asks which of X-Force's targets should be next.

Old Ghosts
Once X-Force regroups at Angel's Aerie, they test the reactions of Rahne and Angel to one another. Rahne reverts to full feral form upon seeing Angel, who responds by transforming into Archangel. Wolverine and Elixir restrain Wolfsbane while Cyclops talks down Archangel, who has trouble controlling his Apocalypse-like mentality while in his transformed state. Laura calls in the Stepford Cuckoos to erase Elixir's memories of X-Force, to help them remain covert. Before they do so, Angel informs them of a live telecast featuring Graydon Creed, who claims an L.M.D. was assassinated in his place and publicly denounces mutants once more. Cyclops assembles X-Force, including Elixir, and unexpectedly declares the Vanisher as their next target.

It is revealed that Scalphunter, a former Marauder, contacted Cyclops about a break-in at an old lab of Mister Sinister's that held an altered version of the Legacy Virus. While in pursuit of the Vanisher, the team runs into Domino, who joins forces with them to recover the Legacy Virus. After cornering Vanisher and inducing an inoperable brain tumor (courtesy of Elixir) to ensure his cooperation, Vanisher reveals he lost the virus while escaping from a horde of Marauder clones that were awakened after the death of Sinister. X-Force returns to the lab and kill the cloned Marauders inside. Domino retrieves the virus, only to be confronted by The Right's shocktroopers, who have come to take the virus for themselves. X-23 is injected with the virus while doing battle, and runs toward a nearby molten vat to destroy herself (thus destroying the virus). Elixir catches Laura as she jumps, and uses his healing powers to purge her of the virus, declaring that his purpose in X-Force is to ensure no more of his friends will die. With Vanisher in tow, X-Force returns home.

Meanwhile, Warpath returns to his tribe's reservation at Camp Verde to visit his brother's grave, but discovers the empty graves of his entire tribe before being violently attacked by the Demon Bear. Just as he's about to be killed, Warpath is saved by Ghost Rider, who offers to teach him how to kill a demon. After engaging the Demon Bear in battle once more, Ghost Rider realizes the demon is reacting to pain caused by a dagger embedded in its body. Once Warpath removes the dagger, the demon is revealed to be the spirit guides of Warpath's tribe, corrupted by the black magic of the dagger. These spirits grant Warpath a vision that reveals the history of the man responsible for digging up the graves of his tribe: Eli Bard. Warpath returns home and tells X-Force what the spirits showed him, which ends with the revelation that Eli is using the Technarch Transmode Virus to revive dead mutants as an offering to his queen, Selene.

Soon after, Beautiful Dreamer mysteriously dies after losing control of her powers and killing hundreds of civilians. Cyclops realizes this was likely caused by the mutated Legacy Virus, and assembles X-Force to deal with the situation. Cyclops also reveals he's in the process of tracking down Cable, and gives each of them a time-travel device that will be remotely activated when Beast determines Cable's exact location in the timestream. Fever Pitch loses control of his powers soon after, resulting in a similar massacre. While escaping the explosion, Archangel spots the Leper Queen and informs Cyclops. Once Boom-Boom, Hellion and Surge are kidnapped, the Stepford Cuckoos use Cerebra to track them down. Hellion and Surge are injected with the altered Legacy Virus and teleported out just as X-Force storm the Leper Queen's base. As Wolverine questions the Leper Queen, Cyclops informs him that Cable has been found and X-Force is being sent after him. Despite Wolverine's protests, Cyclops activates the time-travel devices, sending X-Force forward in time before they can kill the Leper Queen.

Messiah War

X-Force is involuntarily sent to the future to retrieve Cable and Hope. The landscape is a barren, ravaged area, and the team quickly encounters danger. Apocalypse has been defeated, and Stryfe controls this future. X-Force and Cable struggle to save Hope from Bishop and Stryfe.

Not Forgotten
Not Forgotten takes place directly after X-Force's return to the present. X-23 emerges from the timestream just in time to save Boom-Boom from being killed by the Leper Queen. Seconds after she kills the Leper Queen, both she and Boom-Boom are taken into custody by agents of H.A.M.M.E.R. At the United Nations, Hellion and Surge are rescued from the Sapien League by Wolverine, Archangel and Elixir. Boom-Boom is freed from H.A.M.M.E.R. custody by Warpath, while X-23 is returned to The Facility. She wakes up to find her left arm severed by Kimura, wielding a chain saw. Before she can cut off the right arm, Kimura is shot by Agent Morales. Agent Young is revealed to be a member of The Facility that infiltrated H.A.M.M.E.R. to acquire the intel that Morales had on X-23. When Young tries to recruit Morales into The Facility, she rejects his offer by beating him unconscious. In the present, X-23 and Morales make their way to a Facility lab that holds mass amounts of the chemical trigger that forces X-23 to kill. While inside the room, X-23 cuts the claws out of her severed arm and gives them to Morales for safekeeping. She lights a Molotov cocktail of sorts which sets the sprinkler system off. The Facility soldiers finish cutting through to Laura just as Kimura realizes the sprinklers are spraying the Trigger Scent everywhere. X-23 goes feral and kills all the soldiers in her way. She gets to the Facility head's office just as the sprinklers start spraying water, washing away the scent. Kimura manages to club Laura from behind and then kills the Facility head, planning on framing Laura for it. Agent Morales arrives and sets Kimura on fire to distract her while she and Laura make her escape. Morales reveals she rigged the place to explode and they get out in time. The rest of X-Force arrives and takes Laura and her severed claws home, leading into the events of Necrosha.

Necrosha

X-Force is involved in the battle against Selene's resurrected mutant forces on Utopia, until Cyclops sends them to Genosha to kill Selene.

They arrive at Necrosha and manage to rescue Warpath, who then leads them in battle against a god-like Selene, and manage to kill her using an old ritual of Warpath's tribe. Wolverine tells Cyclops that Warpath, X-23, Wolfsbane and Elixir are out of the team, but Cyclops insists that X-Force will be needed more than ever in the time ahead.

X-Men: Second Coming

X-Force is joined by Cable and Cypher on a time-traveling mission to stop an invasion of Nimrods sent from a possible dystopian future. As Cable only has one use remaining on his time-traveling device, it is believed to be a one-way suicide mission. After they complete their mission and Cable sacrifices himself to return X-Force to the present, Hope's mutant powers emerge and she destroys Bastion. After the battle, Logan is confronted by Storm about X-Force. She tells Logan that he never should have involved James, Rahne and Laura, and Logan tells her that he never wanted them involved, but doesn't regret what they did. Logan tells Laura that she's out and to figure out what she wants from life. Afterward, Logan discusses the future of X-Force with Cyclops, who decides to disband the team. Logan meets with his new team a short time later, consisting of himself, Archangel, Fantomex, Psylocke and Deadpool, deciding to run a new X-Force team without the knowledge of Cyclops or the other X-Men.

Volume 4

Dirty/Tricks
The new X-force consists of Cable, Marrow (who despite losing her powers during M-Day is repowered using a psychic headband), Psylocke, Fantomex, and Dr. Nemesis. They are investigating an explosion in Alexandria that put Hope Summers into a coma and find a new mutant nicknamed Meme, since she can only communicate through computers, as her body is comatose. They discover Russian billionaire Yevgeny-Malevitch Volga is behind Alexandria explosion and the kidnapping. He has been kidnapping mutants and supercharging them with kinetic energy and making them into human bombs. While in Paris, they pretend to kill a mutant that can read the minds of cats, so the French secret mutant forces, Le Bureaus Discret, will come to investigate, then they kidnap Le Necrogateur, a mutant that can read the minds of the deceased. Using his powers they find Volga's headquarters and that Volga found a mutant that can teleport between dimensions. Threatening the death of his family, they force the teleporting mutant to bring back a powerful weapon from Earth 1287, that creates super soldiers but greatly decreases their lifespan. During the attack on Volga's base Marrow discovers that she was pregnant during M-Day and volunteered to get her powers back, but at the cost of her pregnancy. She has a mental breakdown and X-Force is captured. It seems all is lost when Cable is super-charged and blown up by Volga. It turns out that Cable was present at Alexandria and it was him and Hope that caused the explosion when he was supercharged by Volga's henchman. Hope mimicked his powers and the chemicals caused her to fall into a coma. Cable survived the explosions since he wasn't really there—Dr. Nemesis keeps Cable locked in stasis and creates a clone of him everyday and uploads his memories. The Cable and Dr. Nemesis attack Volga's base again and teleports his supercharged henchmen into outer space and then Volga seems to commit suicide by super-charging himself and killing the Cable clone again, but Marrow creates a bone shield to protect the team. Volga's spirit survives the explosion and another Cable clone emerges from the X-Force base to mourn over Hope, who was able to manifest herself in a digital avatar by copying the powers of a brain-dead mutant, Meme. Psylocke is able to discover the switch with her psychic powers, but promises Hope that she won't tell Cable.

Hide/Fear
Cable and the X-Force who have barely survived their ordeal with Volga, track a team of British special forces into the desert. The team is tracking terrorists known as the Quaddees. It turns out Volga sold his tech to both the British and the Quaddees. X-Force begins abducting the team, but are attacked by Pete Wisdom, Meggan, and Excalibur from MI-13. Soon the Quaddees kidnap one member of the team, so the three groups decide to work together. Psylocke is able to find out that the super-powered British Special forces team will all die soon from Volga's tech, so the team sacrifices themselves so MI-13 and X-Force can escape. They also learn that there's a secret organization called the Yellow Eye spying on all mutants, who also kidnapped Domino. This series also retcons multiple X-Men backstories with the introduction of ForgetMeNot. His power is to immediately be forgotten by anybody who speaks with him and to be completely unnoticed by people around him unless he acknowledges them. Only Xavier knows of his existence—even setting a psychic alarm clock to check in with ForgetMeNot every hour to remind him somebody remembers him. He hangs around the X-Mansion repelling attackers and saving the X-Men multiple times, without them realizing it and blaming it on dumb luck or deus ex machina. Dr. Nemesis, using an algorithm based on blurs in camera footage and missing toilet paper at the X-Mansion creates a teleporter to bring ForgetMeNot to the X-Force base on an abandoned S.H.I.E.L.D. Helicarrier. The team has great difficulty catching ForgetMeNot, since whenever he hides they forgot about him then take a coffee break, where a prerecorded video by Dr. Nemesis plays reminding them to find ForgetMeNot. This turns into a vicious cycle, almost like a time loop, until ForgetMeNot realizes that he was brought here to trick the Yellow Eye spybots (which look like tiny gnats) into allowing himself to be tracked, place a reverse tracking beacon on one and then the drone will forget him immediately and not self-destruct. This plan works; however, Fantomex then kills ForgetMeNot. Stating that he knew about him all the time since he has three brains and nanobots in his brain. Fantomex says he does it because he is evil and bored. The ships cleaning bots sweep away ForgetMeNot's body and Dr. Nemesis forgets speaking with him and assumes he figured out how to track the spybots on his own.

Ends/Means
The team attacks the Yellow Eye base, but during the battle Meme/Hope Summers hacks into Fantomex's consciousness, thanks to his nanobot brain, in order to learn why he broke up with her. He then reveals that he knew Hope Summers was posing as Meme. He then betrays the team and plans to use the Yellow Eye tracking technology to find his missing clones (Cluster and Weapon XIII). Luckily, it turns out Domino was brainwashed by the Yellow Eye, but Meme was able to hack into her and free her. She then shoots Fantomex in the head. It turns out Yellow Eye is actually Mojo, who reveals that Meme is actually Hope Summers to the rest of the team. Cable debates using the Yellow Eye Technology, but Psylocke wants the facility destroyed. They don't have time to debate since the second clone of Cable was already at the facility with Dr. Nemesis tracking Volga during the prior fight. The team doesn't have time to debate the morality since Fantomex was able to recode Volga's super virus code when he died and E.V.A. reloaded the virus to give her unlimited superpowers. However, since his mind is still mechanical Meme hacked into him making him think he killed the team, while they actually escaped. Back at the base Cable tricks Fantomex into fighting him, but is actually getting Fantomex to destroy various spy agencies and evil organizations. ForgetMeNot also reveals himself to Hope Summers and explains that the original Meme is still alive and saved him by transferring his consciousness and then repaired his body with the ships clean up bots. He reveals that Meme is actually dying, and once she dies Hope will not be able to copy Meme's powers and communicate with the team using her hacking powers. After Meme dies, ForgetMeNot reveals himself to the team and asks Marrow to touch Hope's body, then Hopes copies Marrow's healing factor and is able to temporarily heal herself enough to play a video showing how Cable has been manipulating the team. ForgetMeNot then pushes Psylocke into Hope, who then copies her psychic powers and reveals to the team her troubles childhood and how despite Cable saving her life by traveling between dimensions, she has outgrown him morally and doesn't look up to him. Marrow then kills the Cable clone. Hope also revealed their location to Fantomex, who is on his way to kill them. The team doesn't think they have a chance at stopping him, but Hope has a plan that will only work if they act as a team. Domino and Psylocke distract Fantomex while ForgetMeNot sneaks up to him and teleports him to Hope, who copies his super-powers, as well as the entire teams. She releases all the Cable clones against Fantomex. Hope, using Dr. Nemesis's super intellect, then figures out that Fantomex doesn't believe he is imperfect, but reveals to him that perfect requires cracks and inadequacies and perfection is really being a team. Fantomex cannot comprehend this and has a mental breakdown. Psylocke then uses her psi-blade to scramble his mind. The team later reveals they "fired" Cable from the team.

Awards
Issues #57–58 of the first series were part of the Onslaught storyline which was a top vote-getter for the Comics Buyer's Guide Fan Award for Favorite Comic-Book Story for 1997.

The original X-Force
Before the team best known as X-Force debuted, Marvel introduced an unrelated, little-known group also called X-Force. It was a short-lived group that was designed to replace Freedom Force. The members were not mutants, but received their powers artificially and were named after the X-Men. This group was organized by a government agency known as M Branch and only appeared in the pages of Cloak and Dagger #9–10 (1990).

Other versions
In the alternate reality of the "Days of Future Now" storyline, the X-Force consists of Banshee, Black Tom Cassidy, Cannonball, Domino, Meltdown and Omega Red.

In X-Men '92, X-Force members are: Cable, Domino, Deadpool, Psylocke, Archangel and Bishop.

In other media

Film

 20th Century Fox were in the midst of developing a film adaptation of X-Force. On July 11, 2013, it was reported that Jeff Wadlow had been hired to write and direct the adaptation. Lauren Shuler Donner and Matthew Vaughn would have produced. On December 3, 2013, Rob Liefeld confirmed that Cable and Deadpool would be appearing in the film. The film was planned to be released sometime in the year 2017. In 2015, a piece of concept art depicting Cable, Domino, Warpath, Cannonball, and Feral as members of the team was released. After the release of the live-action film Deadpool, its leading actor Ryan Reynolds felt that the title character would soon be in an X-Force film, and producer Simon Kinberg stated that there was potential for X-Force to be rated-R like Deadpool in contrast to the PG-13 "mainline X-Men movies". X-Men and X2 director Bryan Singer stated in an interview with Fandango that he would like to see X-23 appear in the film as the new Wolverine. In addition, Psylocke was rumored to appear in the film as she is a very prominent member of the team in the comic books; however, actress Olivia Munn (who portrays Psylocke in the film X-Men: Apocalypse) has not addressed these rumors. On November 9, 2016, Kinberg announced to The Hollywood Reporter that the film was still on their schedule. In February 2017, it was reported that Reynolds would co-write the script with Joe Carnahan. On September 7, 2017, Drew Goddard was brought on to write and direct X-Force. On February 21, 2018, Hollywood North Buzz reported that the film would start shooting that October before the Disney/Fox deal was finalized.
 A variation of X-Force appears in the live-action film Deadpool 2. This incarnation of the team is formed by Deadpool to confront Cable and consists of Domino, Bedlam, Shatterstar, Zeitgeist, Vanisher, and a human man named Peter. However, all except Deadpool and Domino are killed briefly after their first mission begins. In a post-credits scene, Deadpool uses Cable's time-travel device to travel back in time and successfully avert Peter's death since he had come to like him.
 Following the release of Deadpool 2, co-writer Rhett Reese confirmed the X-Force movie would be an R-rated take on the X-Men and would have "all the sex, violence, and silliness one would expect from the Deadpool-skewed militarized mutant force". Reese also said "they can get their hands dirty a little bit. There's more gray area. It'll be raunchier, it'll be rated R, I'm sure. We'll get to see an ensemble movie that's pushed, hopefully, as far as the Deadpool individual movie was pushed."
 On February 5, 2019, X-Men film producer Lauren Shuler Donner revealed that X-Force, as well as the rest of the Fox Marvel films, were "on hold" until the Disney-Fox deal went through.

Video games
X-Force appears in Deadpool's ending in Ultimate Marvel vs. Capcom 3, consisting of Domino, Fantomex, and Archangel.

References

External links
X-Men comics on Marvel.com
X-Force, vol. 2 #1
Comics Buyer's Guide Fan Awards

 

Marvel Comics American superheroes
Deadpool characters
X-Men supporting characters